Israel Moses Sieff, Baron Sieff (4 May 1889 – 14 February 1972) was an English businessman and Zionist who was chairman of the British retailer Marks & Spencer from 1964 to 1967.

Early life and education

He was born in Manchester, the son of Ephraim Sieff and Sarah Saffer. His father, an immigrant from Lithuania, founded a prosperous textile business in Manchester. He was educated at Manchester Grammar School alongside Simon Marks, son of Marks & Spencer co-founder Michael Marks. For 63 years, he and Marks shared a close friendship that was cemented when each married the other's sister. He earned a degree in commerce at the University of Manchester.

Sieff joined Simon Marks in Marks & Spencer in 1915 while also maintaining an interest in the Sieff family business. In 1926, when Marks & Spencer became a public company, Sieff joined Simon Marks full-time as vice-chairman and joint managing director. In the early 1930s, Sieff went to the United States and spent several weeks in the merchandise development of Sears to gain practical knowledge to improve the company.

When Simon Marks died in December 1964, Sieff became the chairman and joint managing director of the company.  On 18 January 1966, he was created a life peer as Baron Sieff, of Brimpton in the Royal County of Berkshire.

Following Lord Sieff's death, The Times recalled Sieff's approach to business:

In 1918, Sieff was a member of the Zionist Commission which visited Palestine under the leadership of Chaim Weizmann.

Sieff was president of the Political and Economic Planning think-tank from its foundation in 1931 and its chairman until 1939.

Marriage and family

In 1910, he married Rebecca Marks . His wife was the President of WIZO for most of her life. They had three sons and a daughter:

Hon. Michael David Sieff  (1911–1987)
Marcus Sieff, Baron Sieff of Brimpton  (1913–2001) 
Daniel Sieff (1915–1932)
Judith Hannah Sieff (1921–1999)

The death of their son Daniel, who intended to be a scientist, at age 17 led Sieff — and with the financial support of his business partners and relatives by marriage, the Marks and Sacher families — to endow the 1934 creation, by Chaim Weizmann, of the Daniel Sieff Research Institute in Rehovot in present-day Israel. Renamed the Weizmann Institute of Science in 1949 with the Sieff family's consent, it is Israel's premier research university in the natural sciences.

Sieff was cremated at Golders Green Crematorium and his ashes were placed next to those of Simon Marks.

Arms

References

1889 births
1972 deaths
Businesspeople from Manchester
People educated at Manchester Grammar School
Alumni of the University of Manchester
English businesspeople in retailing
Conservative Party (UK) life peers
English Jews
English people of Lithuanian-Jewish descent
Life peers
Israel David
Jewish British politicians
20th-century English businesspeople
Life peers created by Elizabeth II